Michele Aquino (born September 11, 1989 in Naples) is an Italian-born American soccer player who is currently without a club.

Career

College and amateur
Aquino moved to the United States with his family as a small child, settling in Franklin Square, New York. He attended Carey High School, where he was named the All-County and Team MVP, and played club soccer for Auburndale Supersonics, Kosmos Supersonics and New York United Supersonics, with whom he won three State Cups. He began his college soccer career at Stony Brook University in 2007, transferring to Adelphi University prior to his junior season in 2009.

During his college years he also played with Long Island Academy in the National Premier Soccer League.

Professional
Aquino signed his first professional contract in 2011 when he was signed by F.C. New York of the USL Professional Division. He made his professional debut on May 28, 2011 in a 2-2 tie with the Richmond Kickers.

References

External links
 Stony Brook bio
 Long Island Academy

1989 births
Living people
American soccer players
Adelphi Panthers men's soccer players
F.C. New York players
USL Championship players
Italian emigrants to the United States
Stony Brook Seawolves men's soccer players
People from Franklin Square, New York
Association football midfielders